Sambir urban territorial hromada is an urban hromada (municipality) in the western Lviv Oblast of Ukraine. Its administrative centre is the city of Sambir.

It also has a population of 

Until 18 July 2020, Sambir was incorporated as a city of oblast significance and served as the administrative centre of Sambir Raion, though it did not actually belong to the raion. In July 2020, as part of the administrative reform of Ukraine, which reduced the number of raions of Lviv Oblast to seven, the city of Sambir was merged into Sambir Raion.

Settlements 
In addition to the city of Sambir, the hromada includes four villages:
 
 
 
 Strilkovychi

References 

2020 establishments in Ukraine
Hromadas of Lviv Oblast